Park Ji-weon (born 11 July 1934) was elected as a member of 13th National Assembly of South Korea as Democratic Justice Party.

References 

1934 births
Living people
Democratic Justice Party politicians
People from Gyeonggi Province
People from Suwon
Members of the National Assembly (South Korea)